Pandit Aur Pathan is a 1977 Indian Hindi-language action film directed by Joginder Shelly.

Cast
Agha as Hairan
Helen as Salma
Nazir Hussain as Roopa's blind dad
Dheeraj Kumar as Birju
Kiran Kumar as Inspector Anand
Mehmood as Shankar  Pandit
Ram Mohan as Ramzan
Mukri as  Parheshan
Nazneen as Radha
Tun Tun as  Champakali
Seema Kapoor as Radha's friend
Joginder as  Sher 'Sheroo' Khan  Pathan
Jayshree T. as Chamakchalho
Rajan Haksar as Police Inspector
Meena T. as  Roopa

Songs
"Bam Bam Bhole Khila De Bhang Ke Gole" - Manna Dey, Asha Bhosle
"Mai Pandit Tu Pathan Ek Dhuje Per Kurbaan" - Mohammed Rafi, Manna Dey
"Bataye Rakhi Ka Vyavahar" - Mohammed Rafi, Manna Dey, Asha Bhosle, Kumar Sonik, Dilraj Kaur, Sunita
"Kya Le Ke Aaya Tha Kya Le Ke Jaana Hai" - Mohammed Rafi, Manna Dey
"O Mera Imaan Tujhpe Kurbaan" - Mohammed Rafi, Manna Dey
"Tune Pyar Se Liya Jo Mera Naam" - Asha Bhosle
"Kaise Bhoolun Meri Khatir Tune Ki Kurbaani" - Mohammed Rafi, Manna Dey, Asha Bhosle, Kumar Sonik, Dilraj Kaur, Sunita

References

External links
 

1977 films
1970s Hindi-language films
1977 action films
Films scored by Sonik-Omi
Indian action films
Pashtun diaspora in India